John Burra (born November 20, 1965) is a retired long-distance runner from Tanzania, who won the 1987 edition of Amsterdam Marathon, clocking 2:12:40 on May 10, 1987. He twice represented his native country in the Olympic men's marathon, in 1988 and 1992. At his last Olympic Games appearance in Barcelona, Spain he didn't finish the race.

He won the City-Pier-City Loop half marathon in the Hague in 1991 and also won the Madrid Marathon.

Achievements

References

External links
 
 
 1986 Year Ranking at ARRS.net

1965 births
Living people
Tanzanian male marathon runners
Athletes (track and field) at the 1988 Summer Olympics
Athletes (track and field) at the 1992 Summer Olympics
Olympic athletes of Tanzania
Place of birth missing (living people)